"Seasick" is a single by the American alternative rock band Silversun Pickups. The single was released in a 10" vinyl record format on November 25, 2011 for Record Store Day's "Back to Black Friday" event through Dangerbird Records. A digital version was released on December 13, 2011. The single's A-side and two B-sides are previously unreleased tracks that were originally recorded during the Swoon sessions.

Track listing
Side A
 "Seasick" – 6:45

Side B
 "Broken Bottles" – 3:43
 "Ribbons & Detours" – 3:26

Personnel
 Brian Aubert – guitar, vocals
 Chris Guanlao – drums
 Joe Lester – keys
 Nikki Monninger – bass, vocals

References

Silversun Pickups songs
2011 singles
Record Store Day releases
2011 songs
Dangerbird Records singles